Steven H. Cymbrowitz (born November 14, 1953) is a former Democratic member of the New York State Assembly representing Assembly District 45, which consists of Brighton Beach, Manhattan Beach and Midwood, among other communities located in the borough of Brooklyn. He lost to Michael Novakhov in the 2022 midterm election.

Education
Cymbrowitz received a B.A. degree from C.W. Post College in 1974. He also holds an M.A. in social work from Adelphi University and a J.D. from Brooklyn Law School.

Career
First elected to the State Assembly in 2000, Cymbrowitz ran uncontested in the 2008 general election. In the 2010 general election, he received 57 percent of the vote running against Republican challenger Joseph Hayon.

Cymbrowitz currently serves as Secretary to the Assembly's Majority Conference and chair of the Environmental Conservation Committee's Shoreline Protection Subcommittee. He is also a member of several other standing committees within the Assembly, including Agriculture, Codes, Health, Housing, Insurance and Steering.

Some of his previous positions within government and the non-profit sector include service as the Executive Director of the North Brooklyn Development Corporation, Director of Housing and Community Development for the Metropolitan New York Coordinating Council on Jewish Poverty as well as the Director of Intergovernmental Relations within the New York City Housing Authority (NYCHA).

Personal life
Cymbrowitz, a son of Holocaust survivors, was first married to Lena Azizo Cymbrowitz, who occupied this Assembly seat until her death from cancer in 2000, aged 43. They have two children, Jay and Jennifer.

He is currently married to Vilma Huertas, the Secretary to the Board of New York City Housing Authority.

References

External links
Steven Cymbrowitz In Line For Seat
Biodata at the New York State Democratic Committee website 
Project Vote Smart: Interest Group Ratings
Weiner and Cymbrowitz Tour Manhattan Beach Coastline

1953 births
Living people
Democratic Party members of the New York State Assembly
People from Brighton Beach
Adelphi University alumni
LIU Post alumni
Brooklyn Law School alumni
21st-century American politicians
Politicians from Brooklyn